The 2020 Vermont Senate elections took place as part of the biennial United States elections. Vermont voters elected all 30 state senators from 13 districts, with each district electing between one and six senators. State senators serve two-year terms in the Vermont Senate. A primary election on August 11, 2020, determined which candidates appeared on the November 3 general election ballot. All the members elected will serve in the Vermont General Assembly.

Summary of results

Source:

Retiring incumbents
Three incumbent senators (two Democrats and one Republican) did not seek reelection.

Chittenden: Tim Ashe (D/P) [Ran for Lieutenant Governor (lost primary)]
Chittenden: Debbie Ingram (D)
Rutland: James McNeil (R)

Defeated incumbents

In the primary
No incumbent senator was defeated in the August 11 primary.

In the general election
One incumbent senator sought reelection but was defeated in the general election.
Essex-Orleans: John S. Rodgers (D) (sought reelection as an independent)

Predictions

Detailed results

Source for all election results:

Addison 
Elects two senators.

Bennington 
Elects two senators.

Caledonia 
Elects two senators.

Chittenden 
Elects six senators.
Democratic primary

General election

Essex-Orleans 
Elects two senators.

Franklin 
Elects two senators.

Grand Isle 
Elects one senator.

Lamoille 
Elects one senator.

Orange 
Elects one senator.
Democratic primary

General election

Rutland 
Elects three senators.
Democratic primary

General election

Washington 
Elects three senators.
Democratic primary

Republican primary

General election

Windham 
Elects two senators.

Windsor 
Elects three senators.

See also
 2020 Vermont elections
2020 United States elections
2020 United States House of Representatives election in Vermont
2020 Vermont gubernatorial election
2020 Vermont elections
2020 Vermont House of Representatives election

Notes

References

Senate
Vermont Senate
Vermont Senate elections